Jean-Jacques Millant (1928–1998) was an influential  French bow maker/archetier (French word for maker of string family bows) of the Dominique Peccatte school. 
His cousin, Bernard Millant (born  1929) produced bows similar in style. Millant, son of violin maker Roger Millant, was apprenticed in Mirecourt, Vosges, France by the Morizot Brothers from 1946–1948, then worked with his uncle, Roger and Max Millant in Paris until 1950, after which he opened his own shop in Paris.

In 1970, Millant was awarded the title Un de Meilleurs Ouvriers de France.

His bows, which are strongly influenced by François Peccatte and Dominique Peccatte, quickly enjoyed great esteem among the most highly demanding professionals.
Millant made excellent playing bows (following the Peccatte pattern).

Millant bows function much as good facsimile Peccattes. The combination of choice of materials, weight, strength, and flexibility make them excellent playing tools, and bows by this maker are becoming increasingly desirable in the market today and are sought after by top professionals. - Stefan Hersh 

"Jean-Jacques Millant is considered one of the most important bowmakers of the latter part of the 20th century".  - Gennady Filimonov

References

 
 
 
  
 
 Brueckner, Daniel - The Golden Bows / Der Goldbogen 2000 Edition Erwin Bochinsky.

1928 births
1998 deaths
Bow makers
Luthiers from Paris